George Daniell may refer to:

George Daniell (priest) (1853–1931), English Anglican priest
George Daniell (medical doctor) (1864–1937), medical practitioner and anaesthesiologist
George Daniell (photographer) (1911–2002), American photographer